Lake Prokljan is a lake in the Croatian region of Dalmatia, located near the cities of Skradin and Šibenik.

Geography 

It is not entirely closed, but is connected to the sea by a narrow channel which leads to Šibenik harbor.

Despite its connection to the sea, it does not have high salinity: in the lower layers its water is salty, and near the surface it is freshwater. The northern part of the lake is quite shallow, with an average depth of about 4 meters, while the southern part is deeper, with some 20 to 25 meters.

The lake's major tributary is the Krka River, which has its source near the border with Bosnia and Herzegovina, flows through Knin and enters Prokljansko jezero near the city of Skradin.

Miscellaneous 

In the northern part of the lake, there is a small islet called Stipanac, a site with ruins dating from antiquity to medieval times.

Commerce 
The lake is one of the local tourist attractions, especially owing to its rich offer of local specialties, such as eel and fish (čokalica and golac) in the nearby villages of Raslina, Prokljan, Zaton and Bilice. Another very popular tourist destination is Krka National Park, situated some fifteen kilometers from Skradin, which attracts about 700,000 visitors every year.

References

External links 

Prokljan
Landforms of Šibenik-Knin County